Spirograph is a geometric drawing device that produces mathematical roulette curves of the variety technically known as hypotrochoids and epitrochoids.  The well-known toy version was developed by British engineer Denys Fisher and first sold in 1965.

The name has been a registered trademark of Hasbro Inc. since 1998 following purchase of the company that had acquired the Denys Fisher company. The Spirograph brand was relaunched worldwide in 2013, with its original product configurations, by Kahootz Toys.

History

In 1827, Greek-born English architect and engineer Peter Hubert Desvignes developed and advertised a "Speiragraph", a device to create elaborate spiral drawings.  A man named J. Jopling soon claimed to have previously invented similar methods. When working in Vienna between 1845 and 1848, Desvignes constructed a version of the machine that would help prevent banknote forgeries, as any of the nearly endless variations of roulette patterns that it could produce were extremely difficult to reverse engineer.  The mathematician Bruno Abakanowicz invented a new Spirograph device between 1881 and 1900. It was used for calculating an area delimited by curves.

Drawing toys based on gears have been around since at least 1908, when The Marvelous Wondergraph was advertised in the Sears catalog. An article describing how to make a Wondergraph drawing machine appeared in the Boys Mechanic publication in 1913.

The definitive Spirograph toy was developed by the British engineer Denys Fisher between 1962 and 1964 by creating drawing machines with Meccano pieces. Fisher exhibited his spirograph at the 1965 Nuremberg International Toy Fair. It was subsequently produced by his company. US distribution rights were acquired by Kenner, Inc., which introduced it to the United States market in 1966 and promoted it as a creative children's toy.  Kenner later introduced Spirotot, Magnetic Spirograph, Spiroman, and various refill sets.

In 2013 the Spirograph brand was re-launched worldwide, with the original gears and wheels, by Kahootz Toys. The modern products use removable putty in place of pins to hold the stationary pieces in place. The Spirograph was Toy of the Year in 1967, and Toy of the Year finalist, in two categories, in 2014. Kahootz Toys was acquired by PlayMonster LLC in 2019.

Operation

The original US-released Spirograph consisted of two differently sized plastic rings (or stators), with gear teeth on both the inside and outside of their circumferences. Once either of these rings were held in place (either by pins, with an adhesive, or by hand) any of several provided gearwheels (or rotors)—each having holes for a ballpoint pen—could be spun around the ring to draw geometric shapes. Later, the Super-Spirograph introduced additional shapes such as rings, triangles, and straight bars. All edges of each piece have teeth to engage any other piece; smaller gears fit inside the larger rings, but they also can rotate along the rings' outside edge or even around each other.  Gears can be combined in many different arrangements.  Sets often included variously colored pens, which could enhance a design by switching colors, as seen in the examples shown here.

Beginners often slip the gears, especially when using the holes near the edge of the larger wheels, resulting in broken or irregular lines. Experienced users may learn to move several pieces in relation to each other (say, the triangle around the ring, with a circle "climbing" from the ring onto the triangle).

Mathematical basis

Consider a fixed outer circle  of radius  centered at the origin. Now assume that a point  lying somewhere inside  is located a distance  from 's center. This point  corresponds to the pen-hole in the inner disk of a real Spirograph. Without loss of generality it can be assumed that at the initial moment the point  was on the  axis. In order to find the trajectory created by a Spirograph, follow point  as the inner circle is set in motion.

The point  always indicates the location where the two circles are tangent.

 

or equivalently,

 

It is common to assume that a counterclockwise motion corresponds to a positive change of angle and a clockwise one to a negative change of angle. A minus sign in the above formula accommodates this convention.

 

As defined above,  is the angle of rotation in the new relative system. Because point  obeys the usual law of circular motion, its coordinates in the new relative coordinate system  are

 

 

where  is defined above.

 

(using the fact that function  is odd).

parameters describing the structure of the Spirograph. Namely, let

 

and

 

At the same time,  represents how big the inner circle  is with respect to the outer one .

It is now observed that

 

and therefore the trajectory equations take the form

 

Parameter  is a scaling parameter and does not affect the structure of the Spirograph. Different values of  would yield similar Spirograph drawings.

The two extreme cases  and  result in degenerate trajectories of the Spirograph. In the first extreme case, when , we have a simple circle of radius , corresponding to the case where  has been shrunk into a point.

The other extreme case  corresponds to the inner circle 's radius  matching the radius  of the outer circle , i.e. . In this case the trajectory is a single point. Intuitively,  is too large to roll inside the same-sized  without slipping.

In this case the trajectories are called hypocycloids and the equations above reduce to those for a hypocycloid.

See also

 Cardioid
 Apsidal precession
 Cyclograph
 Geometric lathe 
 Guilloché
 Harmonograph
 Hypotrochoid
 Lissajous curve
 List of periodic functions
 Pantograph
 Pinion
 Rose (mathematics)
 Rosetta (orbit)
 Spirograph Nebula, a planetary nebula that displays delicate, spirograph-like filigree.
 Tusi couple

References

External links
 
 

Art and craft toys
Curves
Products introduced in 1965
Hasbro products
1970s toys
Ballpoint pen art